Mélissa Citrini-Beaulieu (born June 12, 1995) is a Canadian diver. She is currently partnered with Jennifer Abel for synchronized diving. She won a silver medal, together with Abel at the 2017 World Aquatics Championships in Budapest while competing in the 3 m synchro springboard event and a silver medal at the 2020 Summer Olympics in the same event.

References

1995 births
Living people
People from Saint-Constant, Quebec
Sportspeople from Quebec
Francophone Quebec people
Canadian female divers
Divers at the 2018 Commonwealth Games
Divers at the 2020 Summer Olympics
Olympic divers of Canada
World Aquatics Championships medalists in diving
Commonwealth Games competitors for Canada
Medalists at the 2020 Summer Olympics
Olympic silver medalists for Canada
Olympic medalists in diving
21st-century Canadian women